Karl Hocking (born 9 June 1975) is a Welsh former professional rugby union and rugby league footballer who played in the 2000s. Karl is the leader try scoring forward in Welsh rugby union league history since leagues began in 1995. He has scored 148 league tries in his rugby union career.

Background
Karl Hocking was born in Bridgend, Wales.

Playin career

International honours
Karl Hocking won caps for Wales (RL) while at Bridgend Blue Bulls 2005(…2006?) 1(2?)-cap(s) (interchange/substitute).

References

External links
Wales keep Nations title in loss
Crusaders 72-14 Stags
France 38-16 Wales
Transfer talk
Neath storm to victory
Hopkins dismay at Bridgend demise
Strange kicks Caerphilly out of Cup
Injury sidelines Williams

1975 births
Living people
Bridgend Blue Bulls players
Bridgend RFC players
Caerphilly RFC players
Crusaders Rugby League players
Footballers who switched code
Rugby league players from Bridgend
Rugby league props
Rugby union flankers
Rugby union number eights
Rugby union players from Bridgend
Tondu RFC players
Wales national rugby league team players
Welsh rugby league players
Welsh rugby union players